The Chief Justice of Iran is the head of the Judicial system of the Islamic Republic of Iran (Head of Judiciary) and is responsible for its administration and supervision. The head of the judiciary of Iran is required to be an "honorable man" according to Article 157  [Head of Judiciary] of the Constitution of the Islamic Republic of Iran.
The Supreme Leader (Ali Khamenei) appoints and can dismiss the Chief Justice.

The Chief Justice is also the highest judge of the Supreme Court of Iran.

The Chief Justice nominates some candidates for serving as minister of justice and then the President select one of them.
The Chief Justice can serve for two five-year terms.

List of Chief Justices of Iran

 Emadoddin Mirmotahhari to 1975
 Nasser Yeganeh 1975–1979, appointed by Amir-Abbas Hoveyda

Chief Justices since 1979

References

Judiciary of Iran
 
Law of Iran